Manuel Semedo Da Veiga (born 20 January 2000) is a French professional footballer who plays as a forward for Championnat National 2 club Les Herbiers.

Club career
On 5 November 2019, Semedo signed his first professional contract with Sochaux. He made his professional debut with Sochaux in a 2-2 Ligue 2 tie with Rodez AF on 19 September 2020. In July 2021, he signed for USL Dunkerque, following a trial. In September 2022, he signed for Les Herbiers VF.

International career
Born in France, Semedo is of Cape Verdean descent and eligible to represent Portugal as well. He was called up to a training camp for the France U17s and Portugal U18s without making an appearance for either.

References

External links
 

2000 births
Living people
People from Maisons-Laffitte
French footballers 
Portuguese footballers 
French sportspeople of Cape Verdean descent 
Portuguese people of Cape Verdean descent 
Association football forwards
FC Sochaux-Montbéliard players
USL Dunkerque players
Les Herbiers VF players
Ligue 2 players
Championnat National 2 players
Championnat National 3 players
Footballers from Yvelines
Black French sportspeople